Sahebrao Sukram Bagul (born June 1, 1953 in Khairkhunda, Dhule) was a member of the 11th Lok Sabha of India. He represented the Dhule constituency of Maharashtra and is a member of the Bharatiya Janata Party political party.

References

India MPs 1996–1997
1953 births
Living people
Marathi politicians
Bharatiya Janata Party politicians from Maharashtra
Lok Sabha members from Maharashtra
People from Dhule district